Maksym Slavinsky (also as Slavynsky ;12 August 1868 in Stavyshche, Kiev Governorate - 23 November 1945 in Kiev) was a Ukrainian journalist, political and public figure, diplomat and statesman. He was an editor of many newspapers of liberal and pro-Ukrainian disposition in the Russian Empire. In 1918 Slavinsky was appointed as Minister of Labor, serving in the position for less than a month.

Born in the Ukrainian town of Stavyshche of the Kiev Governorate, Slavinsky graduated from the Second Kiev Gymnasium. During his student years he was a member of the Kiev literary club "Pleyada" where along with Lesya Ukrainka he translated the poetry of Heinrich Heine ("Book of songs").

External links
 Maksym Slavinsky at the Encyclopedia of Ukraine
 Maksym Slavinsky at the Jurist Encyclopedia
 Hryskov, A. Odessa in the life of Maksym Slavinsky. "Chornomorski Novyny". 7 March 2013.
 Ocheretyany, V. Life and works of Maksym Antonovych Slavynsky. "Electronic library of textbooks".

1868 births
1945 deaths
People from Stavyshche
People from Kiev Governorate
Taras Shevchenko National University of Kyiv alumni
Ukrainian Democratic Party (1904) politicians
20th-century Ukrainian politicians
Labor ministers of Ukraine
Ambassadors of Ukraine to Czechoslovakia
Inmates of Lukyanivska Prison